Forest City may refer to:

Place names

Canada
Forest City, New Brunswick

China
Forest City, China

Malaysia
Forest City, Johor, a real estate megaproject in Johor, Malaysia

United States
Forest City, California, or Forest, a ghost town
Forest City, Florida
Forest City, Illinois
Forest City, Indiana
Forest City, Iowa
Forest City, Kansas
Forest City, Maine
Forest City, Missouri
Forest City, Minnesota
Forest City, North Carolina
Forest City, Pennsylvania
Forest City, South Dakota
Forest City, Utah, a ghost town
Forest City Township (disambiguation)

Place nicknames
"The Forest City", a nickname for:

Canada
 London, Ontario

United States
Atlanta, Georgia
The Forest City, Cleveland, Ohio
Portland, Maine
Rockford, Illinois

Sports
Forest City, an American professional baseball team that played in Cleveland, Ohio, from 1870 to 1872; see Cleveland Forest Citys
Forest City, an American professional baseball team that played in Rockford, Illinois, in 1871; see Rockford Forest Citys

Other
Forest City (ship), a passenger steamer that was burned and sunk in 1907
Forest City Joe (1926–1960), American blues musician
Forest City Realty Trust, a real estate development company based in Cleveland, Ohio

See also
Forrest City, Arkansas